Yasin Islek (Turkish written: Yasin İşlek) (born February 8, 1988 in Solingen, Germany) is a German-Turkish actor and model.

Life 
Yasin Islek is a German-Turkish actor, model and coach. He graduated in 2011 as a media agent (artists, management, marketing and events). After his first apprenticeship, he also completed the acting school at the Filmactingschool Düsseldorf in Düsseldorf (SSA) in 2015. Yasin speaks 4 languages: English, German, Turkish and Spanish. He is also the CEO of the Artisdo Agency.

Even as a child, Islek shot sketches in front of the camera. Islek made his first touch with acting at the middle school in 2003. The first professional experience he made in 2004, when he played a supporting role in Shakespeare's The Tempest. This was his final decision to become an actor. Since then, he has been active in various cinema and TV productions. For example, at the famous German series Alarm for Cobra 11 in Cologne or beside to Adam Driver, Marion Cotillard and Simon Helberg in Annette. Since 2018 Islek is one of the main cast of Sketchcomedy-Series JokeRS Comedy beside to Eddy Cheaib and Caroline Pharo. 

Islek started modeling with a contest in a shopping mall (with jury member Topmodel Jana Ina Zarrella). His first professional experience as a model, was at this contest, which consisted of a photo shooting and a fashion show, he won the second place in the finals. Since then he has had various shoots, image films and fashion shows for brands and boutiques such as Jack&Jones, s.Oliver, Adidas, Emilio Adani and many others.

Filmography 
 2010: 
 2011: Indisch für Anfänger 
 2012: Danni Lowinski (Season 3 - Episode "Nazi")
 2013:  
 2013: ZDFneo Magazin - Spoof Commercial for "Glümp Ayrancola" Drink 
 2013: Tek Ümit - The Only Chance
 2013: Knallerfrauen (Season 3 - Sketch "Yes I Know")
 2014: Alarm für Cobra 11
 2016: Volt
 2016: Rabenmütter (Season 1 – Sketch „Pfefferspray“)
 2017: Thirteen
 2018: Jokers Comedy
 2019: We Go High
 2021: Annette

Theater 
 2003: The Tempest (Shakespeare) [Supporting Role]

Modelography 
 2010: Marktkarree Model Contest 2010 (2nd Place) [with Jana Ina Zarrella]
 2011: Romeo&Julia Boutique Summer Fashion Show in Düsseldorf
 2011: Romeo&Julia Boutique Winter Fashion Show at Castle Garath in Düsseldorf
 2012: I Love Models Contest in Cologne (Finals) [with Irena Then (Playmate August 2011)]
 2014: Marktkarree (5th Anniversary) Camp David, s.Oliver & Adidas Spring Collection
 2016: Emilio Adani Winter Collection in Leverkusen

Awards 
 2017: PLATINUM REMI AWARD 2017 ("for best Shortfilm in the Category Independent Shortfilm 311. Dramatic – Original") of the Independentfilmfestival WorldFest Houston in Houston (Texas) for THIRTEEN by Sasha Sibley

 2019: CHARITY VIDEO AWARD 2019 (3rd) for the best Shortfilm in Düsseldorf (NRW) for WE GO HIGH by Denis Seyfert

 2021: GOLDEN PALM 2021 (nominated) for best Film at Cannes Film Festival in Cannes (France) for ANNETTE by Leos Carax

References

External links 

 Yasin Islek - Official Website

1988 births
Living people
Turkish male models
21st-century German male actors
21st-century Turkish male actors
German male film actors
Turkish male film actors
German male television actors
Turkish male television actors